 
Citizen Soldiers: The U.S. Army from the Normandy Beaches to the Bulge to the Surrender of Germany is a non-fiction book about World War II written by Stephen E. Ambrose and published in 1997. It deals with Allied soldiers moving in from the Normandy beaches, and through Europe (between June 7, 1944 and May 7, 1945). In addition to telling short stories of countless soldiers experiencing the war, the author also explains the events before telling the stories. He interviewed dozens of soldiers in the making of the book.

The book picks up where his previous book describing the preparations and execution of the Normandy Landings, D-Day, June 6, 1944: The Climactic Battle of World War II, left off.

Reception
The book was well received and became a New York Times best seller. Notable figures such as Colin Powell have praised the book. The Wall Street Journal has also credited the book.

References

External links
Washington Journal interview with Ambrose on Citizen Soldiers, November 12, 1997, C-SPAN

1997 non-fiction books
Non-fiction books about military history of the United States
History books about World War II
Books by Stephen Ambrose
Non-fiction books about the United States Army
United States Army in World War II
Western European theatre of World War II